The 2018 French Open described below in detail, in form of day-by-day summaries.

All dates are CEST (UTC+2).

Day 1 (27 May)
Schedule of play

Seeds out:
Women's Singles:  Jeļena Ostapenko [5],  Venus Williams [9],  Johanna Konta [22]

Day 2 (28 May)
Schedule of play

Seeds out:
Men's Singles:  Philipp Kohlschreiber [22],  Stan Wawrinka [23],  Gilles Müller [29]
Women's Singles:  Anastasija Sevastova [20],  Kristina Mladenovic [29]

Day 3 (29 May)
Schedule of play

Seeds out:
Men's Singles:  Jack Sock [14],  Adrian Mannarino [25],  Feliciano López [28]
Men's Doubles:  Mike Bryan /  Sam Querrey [16]

Day 4 (30 May)
Schedule of play

Seeds out:
Men's Singles:  Sam Querrey [12],  Tomáš Berdych [17]
Women's Singles:  Carla Suárez Navarro [23],  Alizé Cornet [32]
Men's Doubles:  Aisam-ul-Haq Qureshi /  Jean-Julien Rojer [7],  Ben McLachlan /  Jan-Lennard Struff [14]
Women's Doubles:  Ashleigh Barty /  CoCo Vandeweghe [7],  Jeļena Ostapenko /  Elena Vesnina [10],  Shuko Aoyama /  Miyu Kato [14],  Alicja Rosolska /  Abigail Spears [15]
Mixed Doubles:  Chan Hao-ching /  Michael Venus [6]

Day 5 (31 May)
Schedule of play

Seeds out:
Men's Singles:  Denis Shapovalov [24]
Women's Singles:  CoCo Vandeweghe [15],  Ashleigh Barty [17],  Zhang Shuai [27],  Anastasia Pavlyuchenkova [30]
Men's Doubles:  Ivan Dodig /  Rajeev Ram [9]
Women's Doubles:  Elise Mertens /  Demi Schuurs [12]
Mixed Doubles:  Kateřina Siniaková /  Jamie Murray [4]

Day 6 (1 June)
Schedule of play

Seeds out:
Men's Singles:  Grigor Dimitrov [4],  Pablo Carreño Busta [10],  Roberto Bautista Agut [13],  Damir Džumhur [26]
Women's Singles:  Elina Svitolina [4],  Naomi Osaka [21]
Men's Doubles:  Pablo Cuevas /  Marcel Granollers [11],  Julio Peralta /  Horacio Zeballos [15]
Women's Doubles:  Nadiia Kichenok /  Anastasia Rodionova [16]
Mixed Doubles:  Tímea Babos /  Rohan Bopanna [7]

Day 7 (2 June)
Schedule of play

Seeds out:
Men's Singles:  Lucas Pouille [15],  Kyle Edmund [16],  Richard Gasquet [27],  Albert Ramos Viñolas [31],  Gaël Monfils [32]
Women's Singles:  Karolína Plíšková [6],  Petra Kvitová [8],  Julia Görges [11],  Kiki Bertens [18],  Magdaléna Rybáriková [19],  Daria Gavrilova [24]
Men's Doubles:  Łukasz Kubot /  Marcelo Melo [1],  Jamie Murray /  Bruno Soares [4],  Raven Klaasen /  Michael Venus [10]
Women's Doubles:  Latisha Chan /  Bethanie Mattek-Sands [4],  Raquel Atawo /  Anna-Lena Grönefeld [11]
Mixed Doubles:  Xu Yifan /  Oliver Marach [3]

Day 8 (3 June)
Schedule of play

Seeds out:
Men's Singles:  David Goffin [8],  Kei Nishikori [19],  Fernando Verdasco [30]
Women's Singles:  Anett Kontaveit [25],  Barbora Strýcová [26],  Mihaela Buzărnescu [31]
Women's Doubles:  Kiki Bertens /  Johanna Larsson [9]
Mixed Doubles:  Andreja Klepač /  Jean-Julien Rojer [5]

Day 9 (4 June)
Schedule of play

Seeds out:
Men's Singles:  Kevin Anderson [6],  John Isner [9],  Fabio Fognini [18]
Women's Singles:  Caroline Wozniacki [2],  Caroline Garcia [7],  Elise Mertens [16]
Men's Doubles:  Henri Kontinen /  John Peers [3]
Women's Doubles:  Gabriela Dabrowski /  Xu Yifan [5],  Nicole Melichar /  Květa Peschke [13]

Day 10 (5 June)
Schedule of play

Seeds out:
Men's Singles:  Alexander Zverev [2],  Novak Djokovic [20]
Women's Singles:  Daria Kasatkina [14]
Men's Doubles:  Juan Sebastián Cabal /  Robert Farah [5],  Rohan Bopanna /  Édouard Roger-Vasselin [13]
Women's Doubles:  Andreja Klepač /  María José Martínez Sánchez [3]

Day 11 (6 June)
Schedule of play

Seeds out:
Women's Singles:  Angelique Kerber [12],  Maria Sharapova [28]
Women's Doubles:  Tímea Babos /  Kristina Mladenovic [1]
Mixed Doubles:  Anna-Lena Grönefeld /  Robert Farah [8]

Day 12 (7 June)
Schedule of play

Seeds out:
Men's Singles:  Marin Čilić [3],  Diego Schwartzman [11]
Women's Singles:  Garbiñe Muguruza [3],  Madison Keys [13]
Men's Doubles:  Nikola Mektić /  Alexander Peya [8]
Mixed Doubles:  Gabriela Dabrowski /  Mate Pavić [1]

Day 13 (8 June)
Schedule of play

Seeds out:
Men's Singles:  Juan Martín del Potro [5]
Men's Doubles:  Feliciano López /  Marc López [12]
Women's Doubles:  Andrea Sestini Hlaváčková /  Barbora Strýcová [2],  Chan Hao-ching /  Yang Zhaoxuan [8]

Day 14 (9 June)
Schedule of play

Seeds out:
Women's Singles:  Sloane Stephens [10]
Men's Doubles:  Oliver Marach /  Mate Pavić [2]

Day 15 (10 June)
Schedule of play

Seeds out:
Men's Singles:  Dominic Thiem [7]

Day-by-day summaries
French Open by year – Day-by-day summaries